Donnie Ray Oldham (February 23, 1951 – July 23, 2005) was an American football defensive back in the National Football League (NFL). He played professionally  for the Baltimore Colts, Pittsburgh Steelers, New York Giants, and Detroit Lions.

Biography
Oldham was born in Gallatin, Tennessee and graduated from Gallatin High School in Gallatin. He played college football at Middle Tennessee State University in Murfreesboro, Tennessee.

Oldham was drafted by the Baltimore Colts (1953–1983) in the 8th round (189th overall) of the 1973 NFL Draft. He played for ten seasons in the NFL.

He earned a Super Bowl ring in 1978 when he was part of the Pittsburgh Steelers defense.

 In 1983 Oldham was inducted into the Blue Raider Hall of Fame at Middle Tennessee State University.

He died on July 23, 2005 in Soddy-Daisy, Tennessee after suffering a heart attack while on a bike ride.

References

External links
 
 databaseFootball.com
 Pro-Football-Reference.Com
 NFL Enterprises LLC
 Blue Raider Hall of Fame
 The New York Times: Ray Oldham, Super Bowl Winner in '79, Dies at 54
 WATE.com: Ray Oldham dead at age 54

1951 births
2005 deaths
Players of American football from Tennessee
American football cornerbacks
American football safeties
Middle Tennessee Blue Raiders football players
Baltimore Colts players
Pittsburgh Steelers players
New York Giants players
Detroit Lions players